OPS-18 is a two-dimensional radar manufactured by Japan Radio Company. It is installed as an anti-water search radar on the Maritime Self-Defense Force's escort ship. Variations include OPS-18-1 and OPS-18-3.

The model numbers of the Maritime Self-Defense Force's electronic devices, including this machine, are generally based on the naming rules for military electronic devices of the U.S. military. It is for radar mounted on surface vessels, for detection / distance direction measurement / search.

OPS-3 / OPS-5 
The National Safety Agency's Coastal Security Force obtained the AN/SPS-5B radar as equipment for the Bluebird-class minesweeper (Yashima-class minesweeper) provided by the United States in the 1958 plan.

In Japan, the OPS-3 was developed based on this AN/SPS-5, and started to be installed on the JDS Akebono, the first domestic guard ship for the National Safety Agency guards, and the Ikazuchi-class destroyer escort. The subsequently developed OPS-5 was installed on the first Akizuki-class destroyer.

On board ships

OPS-3 
JDS Akebono
Ikazuchi-class destroyer 
Murasame-class destroyer

OPS-5 
Ayanami-class destroyer
Akizuki-class destroyer

OPS-16 / OPS-17 
In the 1960s, the OPS-16 radar was developed as the second generation based on the OPS-3 and OPS-5. These used slightly higher frequencies and had enhanced ECCM properties.

It has undergone a minor upgrade which allowed it to switch between true and relative orientations, and has video output and trigger output terminals. In addition, the OPS-16D type has been made into a semiconductor element based on the OPS-16C type, and the pulse width and pulse repetition frequency have been changed to improve performance. In addition, the major version upgrade version of OPS-17 has two intermediate frequency bandwidths and two video bandwidths.

On board ships

OPS-16 

 Umitaka-class submarine chaser
 Mizutori-submarine chaser
 Isuzu-class destroyer escort
 Tachikaze-class destroyer 
 JS Chiyoda
 Hibiki-class ocean surveillance ship
 JDS Azuma
 Fuji

OPS-17 

 Yamagumo-class destroyer
 Takatsuki-class destroyer
 Minegumo-class destroyer
 Chikugo-class destroyer escort 
 Haruna-class destroyer 
 JDS Hayase 
 JDS Sōya

OPS-18 
The OPS-18 was developed from the 1970s to the 1980s by introducing the frequency agility method. The OPS-18 has two built-in transmitters, a wideband automatic tuning function and an automatic collision prevention assistance (ARPA) function, and can display up to 10 targets at the same time.

On the other hand, while removing the ARPA function in OPS-18-1, it has a target indication function with improved minimum sensitivity, and it plays a role as a low-altitude warning radar in the Hatsuyuki-class destroyer. In addition, in OPS-18-3, a parabolic cylinder type antenna is used instead of the parabolic torus type antenna conventionally used in this series.

On board ships 
 Hatsuyuki-class destroyer
 PG-821-class patrol boats
 Hayabusa-class patrol boat 
 Miura-class tank landing ship  
 Uraga-class mine countermeasure vessel 
 Towada-class replenishment ship 
 Futami-class hydrographic survey ship 
 JS Kurobe
 JS Tenryū
 Hibiki-class ocean surveillance Ship 
 JS Kashima
 JS Asuka

Gallery

Citations

References 

 Norman Friedman (2006). The Naval Institute Guide to World Naval Weapon Systems.  Naval Institute Press.  ISBN 9781557502629
 Self-Defense Force Equipment Yearbook 2006-2007. Asaun News Agency. ISBN 4-7509-1027-9

Naval radars
Military radars of Japan
Military equipment introduced in the 1970s